Xanthe Adams (born 14 November 1968), now Xanthe Paltridge, is an Australian former professional tennis player.

Adams, competing on tour briefly during the late 1980s, reached career best rankings of 365 for singles and 431 for doubles. She featured as a wildcard in the singles main draw of the 1988 Australian Open and was beaten in the first round by Manon Bollegraf.

References

External links
 
 

1968 births
Living people
Australian female tennis players